The Europaviertel (European quarter) is a housing and business quarter development in the Gallus district of Frankfurt am Main, Germany. Development work began in 2005, and the development is scheduled for completion by 2019. The area will have offices, hotels, apartments, parks, shopping, and leisure facilities. After its completion, Europaviertel will approximately have a population of 30,000 workers and 10,000 residents. The Skyline Plaza complex, including a shopping mall and congress center, is within the district.

External links

Districts of Frankfurt
Geography of Frankfurt